HMS Scythe was an  destroyer built for the Royal Navy during the First World War. She was involved in the Irish Civil War in the interwar period before being sold for scrap in 1931.

Description
The Admiralty S class were larger and faster versions of the preceding . They displaced  at normal load. The ships' complement was 82 officers and ratings.

The ships were powered by a single Brown-Curtis geared steam turbine that drove two propeller shafts using steam provided by three Yarrow boilers. Scythe reached a speed of  during her sea trials.

The Admiralty S-class ships were armed with three single QF  Mark IV guns. One gun was positioned on the forecastle, the second was on a platform between the funnels and the third at the stern. They were equipped with a single QF 2-pounder "pom-pom" anti-aircraft gun on a platform forward of the mainmast. They were also fitted with two rotating twin mounts for  torpedoes amidships and two 18-inch (450 mm) torpedo tubes, one on each broadside abaft the forecastle.

Construction and career
Scythe, the first ship of her name to serve in the Royal Navy, was ordered on 23 June 1917 as part of the Twelfth War Programme from John Brown & Company. The ship was laid down at the company's Clydebank shipyard on 14 January 1918, launched on 25 May 1918, completed on 7 July and commissioned that same month.

Scythe served in the 12th Destroyer Flotilla of the Grand Fleet in 1918–1919, moving to the new 7th Destroyer Flotilla at Rosyth in March 1919 before going into reserve at Devonport on 12 November 1919. Subsequently, she was re-commissioned on 4 April 1923, as an independent command in Irish waters after the establishment of the Irish Free State. Between October 1923 and January 1925 her first lieutenant was Frederick Bell, later to earn fame as the captain of  during the Battle of the River Plate. Scythe was involved in a shooting incident at Queenstown (modern-day Cobh) on 21 March 1924, when machine gun fire was directed at her. She was sold for scrap on 28 November 1931 to John Cashmore Ltd (Newport).

Notes

References
 
 
 
 
 

 

S-class destroyers (1917) of the Royal Navy
Ships built on the River Clyde
1918 ships
World War I destroyers of the United Kingdom